, also simply known as Little Women, is a Japanese animated television series adaptation of Louisa May Alcott's 1868-69 two-volume novel Little Women, produced by Nippon Animation. It was first aired in 1987 (January–December) by the Fuji TV network.

A sequel series, Little Women II: Jo's Boys, premiered in 1993.

Plot 
The animated series is loosely derived from Part One and partly on the beginning of Part Two of the book, and introduces new material and characters.  The series begins with the introduction of the March family happily living near Gettysburg (the nearby town of York in the English version), until one day during a picnic, Mr. March notices Confederate scouts at a riverbank.  As an officer of the Union Army on leave with a broken arm, Mr. March hesitantly leaves his family to inform his superiors and to prepare for the upcoming battle.  Meanwhile, his family endures the Confederate occupation and even helps an escaped slave named John from being forcibly recruited to fight for the Confederacy.

Eventually, Union forces arrive and in the ensuing battle the March family home is destroyed and their investment (which had also been their savings) stolen.  With no other options, the family leaves Gettysburg to Newcord, where they hope to be taken by an estranged aunt of father.  Upon arriving in Newcord, they are coldly received by the old woman and even less so by David, an egotistical nephew who constantly asks for loans and antagonizes the family.  Despite the reception, Aunt March allows the family to stay at home until they can get back on their feet.

Determined to have a sense of normalcy and persevere their hardship, Meg finds work as a Governess while Jo alternates between being a companion to Aunt March and Author.  During a sales pitch to sell a short story to a local newspaper, her work and her character are presumptuously criticized by Anthony, a local reporter.  Upset and resolute, Jo throws herself into her writing ultimately earning the respect of Anthony and forms an amicable relationship.

In time, the March family moves into a new home and the events that follow begin to reference the plot of the original novel:  The 18th episode is based on Chapter 3 and follows the first part of the book.  The storyline from Chapter 1 (Christmas 1863) begins in episode 21.

Characters 

For more information on the main characters, including the March sisters, Laurie, and Mary, see Little Women.

 Eiko Yamada (Heidi Lenhart in English dub) as 
 Keiko Han as 
 Mayumi Shou as 
 Rei Sakuma (Rebecca Forstadt in English dub) as 
 Nobuo Tobita 
 Taeko Nakanishi as 
 Osamu Saka (Michael Forest in English dub) as 
 Kazuyuki Sogabe (Dave Mallow in English dub) as 
 Ranko Mizuki (Melodee Spevack in English dub) as 
 Kohei Miyauchi (Mike Reynolds in English dub) as 
 Toshihiko Kojima (Ardwight Chamberlain in English dub) as John Brooke ( in Japanese)
 Kozo Shioya as 
 Ryuji Saikachi (Milton James in English dub) as 
 Miyoko Aoba as 
 Maria Kawamura (Wendee Lee in English dub) as  

Writer Akira Miyazaki introduced several new supporting characters not in the original novel:
   is a Newcord reporter and friend of Jo's.  He and Jo get off to a bad start when he criticizes her writing, but eventually become close friends, and Anthony helps her family find a new house in Newcord.  He also encourages Jo to keep writing and improve.  He leaves for New York in the second-to-last episode, and inspires Jo to do the same. In some episodes he appears to have feelings for Jo, who, in her single-minded quest to become a great writer, does not reciprocate or even seem to notice.
   (possibly named after Rupert Murdoch) is the owner and publisher of The Newcord Times, and Anthony's boss.  He has a high opinion of Jo's talents and reassures her whenever she is discouraged by Anthony's criticisms.  
   is Aunt March's nephew, a money-grubbing gambler and ne'er-do-well who appears only to care for his aunt because she loans him money.  He antagonizes the March family, and Jo in particular, out of fear that he will lose his place as her sole heir.
   is a runaway slave. In an early episode, the March family hide him in their house from Confederate soldiers.  In a later episode, he returns and gets a job at the Newcord newspaper.
  is the March family's pet kitten.  She first appears in episode two, when Beth discovers the abandoned kitten half-drowned and nearly frozen to death in the rain.  Beth and her sisters nurse the kitten back to health, and Milky Ann becomes a treasured member of the family.
 Aunt March had several additional servants introduced in this anime in addition to Esther the maid, including Ben the coachman and Dorothy the cook (who appeared in only one episode).  Also, in addition to her bird, Polly, Aunt March has a dog, a poodle named .

Name and character changes 
In addition to the town of Concord itself being renamed "Newcord" for the anime version (which carried over into the English dub), several characters also underwent name changes in this series.  For example, the March parents, named Margaret and Robert in the original novel, are Mary and Frederic in this series, and Mr. Brooke is renamed from John to Carl in Japanese and some of the European dub versions (although the English dubbers changed his name back to John).  Also, the March family's live-in help, Hannah, is African-American in this version instead of Irish and Caucasian, perhaps to draw more attention with Japanese viewers to the plight of black Americans in the 19th century.

Broadcast 
Little Women aired on Fuji Television from 11 January 1987 to 27 December 1987 as part of Nippon Animation's World Masterpiece Theater.  The series features contributions from several well-known Studio Ghibli staffers, including co-character designer Yoshifumi Kondo and animation director Atsuko Otani.  The chief director was Nippon Animation/WMT veteran Fumio Kurokawa with storyboard duties handled by various other directors, and Akira Miyazaki is credited with scripting all 48 episodes.  Kurokawa, Otani, and character designer and chief animation director Toshiki Yamazaki had all been involved in the previous WMT series Princess Sarah, as had Jo's voice actress, Eiko Yamada.
The series was broadcast aired across Asia by the anime satellite television network, Animax.

Little Women was first dubbed into English by Saban Entertainment and was broadcast across the United States by HBO in 1988 under the title Tales of Little Women, making it one of only three WMT serials to have been broadcast on television in the United States. From 2009 to 2017, the series aired in the United States on Smile of a Child and in the Philippines on DZOZ-TV. Unusual for a Saban Entertainment dub of an anime series, the English dub version of Ai no Wakakusa Monogatari kept the original Japanese musical score by Kazuo Otani, although the theme songs were replaced with a new one by Haim Saban and Shuki Levy, who also composed some additional music for the series itself. The series has not yet been released on DVD in English, although a compilation of two episodes was released on VHS in the United States in 1992 as Little Women's Christmas Story. The full series was released in 2017 on Amazon Prime under the title Tales Of Little Women.

The series has also achieved a high level of popularity in Europe, Israel, Iran, Arab World, and Latin America.

Staff

 Original work: Little Women by Louisa May Alcott
 Executive producer: Koichi Motohashi
 Producer: Junzo Nakajima (Nippon Animation), Taihei Ishikawa (Fuji TV)
 Planning: Shoji Sato (Nippon Animation), Eiichi Kubota (Fuji TV)
 Director: Fumio Kurokawa
 Script: Akira Miyazaki
 Storyboards: Yoshio Kuroda, Fumio Kurokawa, Norio Yazawa, Shinichi Tsuji, Kozo Kuzuha, Hiromi Sugimura, Shinichi Matsumi, Takeshi Yamaguchi, Eiji Okabe, Shigeo Koshi, Takao Yotsuji, Shin Namioka, Fumio Ikeno
 Character design: Yoshifumi Kondo, Toshiki Yamazaki
 Animation director: Toshiki Yamazaki, Takumi Koyama, Atsuko Onuki
 Art director: Masamichi Takano
 Color coordination: Akiko Koyama
 Editing: Hidetoshi Kadono, Shinichi Natori, Yoshihiro Kasahara
 Layout: Shohei Kawamoto
 Director of photography: Toshiaki Morita
 Recording director: Etsuji Yamada
 Music: Kazuo Otani
 Production desk: Shunichi Kosao 
 Production manager: Mitsuru Takakuwa  
 Sound effects: Akihiko Matsuda 
 Special effects: Masao Yoshiyama 
 Production: Nippon Animation, Fuji TV

Theme songs
 Opening Themes
 (eps 1-14)
 Singer : Eri Nitta
 Lyricist : Yasushi Akimoto
 Composer : Toshihiko Takamizawa
 Arranger : Jun Satō
 (eps 15-48)
 Singers : Keiko Han, Eiko Yamada, Mayumi Shō, Rei Sakuma
 Lyricist : Yumi Ōkubo
 Composer : Kōichi Morita
 Arranger : Kazuo Ōtani
 Odd times are first section, even times are second section.

 Ending Themes
 (eps 1-14)
 Singer : Eri Nitta
 Lyricist : Keiko Asō
 Composer and arranger : Masataka Matsutōya
 (eps 15-48)
 Singer : Satoko Shimonari
 Lyricist : Yumi Ōkubo
 Composer and arranger : Kōichi Morita

Episode list

Toshiki Yamazaki is animation director for the first five episodes, for odd-numbered episodes 7 through 17, and for even-numbered episodes 20 through 48.  Takumi Koyama is animation director for even-numbered episodes 6 through 16 and for odd-numbered episodes 19 through 47.  Atsuko Otani is animation director for episode 18 only.

All episodes are written by Akira Miyazaki.

All episodes are directed by Fumio Kurokawa, who also drew storyboards for episodes 2, 3, and 48.  Other storyboard artists included: 
 Yoshio Kuroda (1, 28, co-storyboard duties on episode 31) 
 Norio Yazawa (4, 7, 9)
 Shinichi Tsuji (5, 8, 12, 14, 18, 22, 26, 29, 32, 35, 38, 42, 44, 47)
 Kozo Kuzuha (6, 11, 15, 17, 20, 25)
 Hiromi Sugimura (13, 19, 30, 34, 37, and co-storyboarded episodes 10, 23, 31)
 Shinichi Matsumi (co-storyboarded episodes 10 and 16)
 Takeshi Yamaguchi (co-storyboarded episodes 16 and 23)
 Eiji Okabe (21, 24)
 Shigeo Koshi (27, 33, 40)
 Shin Namioka (39, 41)
 Takao Yotsuji (36) 
 Fumio Ikeno (43, 45, 46)

Alternative Titles
Ai no Wakakusa Monogatari (Japanese Title)
As Mulherzinhas (Portuguese Title)
Eine fröhliche Familie (German Title)
Les Quatre Filles du Dr March (French Title)
Love's Tale of Young Grass (English Title)
Mujercitas (Spanish Title)
נשים קטנות Nashim Ktanot (Hebrew Title)
Onder Moeders Vleugels (Dutch Title)
Piccole donne (Italian Title)
Tale of Love's Young Shoots (English Title)
Tales of the Little Women (English Title)
Una per tutte, tutte per una (Italian Title)
Маленькие женщины (Russian Title)
زنان کوچک (Persian Title)
نساء صغيرات (Arabic Title)
小婦人 (Chinese Title)
愛の若草物語 (Japanese Title)
작은 아씨들 Jag-eun Assideul (Korean Title)

See also 
 Little Women (1981 TV series), Toei Animation's adaptation of Louisa May Alcott's novel.

References

External links
 Little Women at Nippon Animation's English website through the Wayback Machine
 
 

1987 anime television series debuts
1987 Japanese television series endings
Animated television series about sisters
Historical anime and manga
Romance anime and manga
World Masterpiece Theater series
Television series set in the 1860s
Television shows set in Pennsylvania
Television shows set in Massachusetts
Television series by Saban Entertainment
Television series based on Little Women
1980s children's television series